Ormi Patras is a Greek women's club based in Patras. It was founded in 2003 through the fusion of Thriamvos Patras, Poseidonas Patras and Foinikas Patras. It is a major protagonist in the Greek women's handball cup and championship. Ormi Patras has won 6 Greek championships and 4 Greek cups. In 2015, Ormi Patras withdrew from the championship due to financial problems.

Titles & honours
Women's handball

National titles: 10Greek Championship (6): 2007, 2008, 2009, 2010, 2011, 2012Greek Cup (4):''' 2007, 2009, 2010, 2012
Honours
 Greek Championship runner up (4): 2004, 2006, 2013, 2015
 Greek Cup runner up (5) : 2003, 2004, 2005, 2006, 2008

Team's roster 2010-2011
Anna Stratou,
Eugenia Karagiorga,
Athanasia Strataki,
Irini Papazoglou,
Olesia Semenchenko,
Xristina Anthitsi,
Edina Suto,
Catalina Gheorghe,
Rugile Niparaviciene,
Jurate Zilinskaite

President: Antonis Skiathas
General Manager: Andreas Kogas
Coach: Jani Ivan Cop
Coach Assistant: Legouras Christos

References

External links 
Team's official website

Greek handball clubs
Patras